Stuart R. Levine (born May 27, 1947) is an American politician who served in the New York State Assembly from the 10th district from 1973 to 1974.

References

1947 births
Living people
Republican Party members of the New York State Assembly